Jenni is a feminine given name, sometimes a modern diminutive or short form of Jennifer. The etymology is actually that of a diminutive of Jane, however.

A separate name, with the same spelling, serves as a Finnish language diminutive of Johanna.

People with the given name Jenni

 Jenni Howell Asserholt (born 1988), ice hockey player
 Jenni Baird (born 1976), Australian actress
 Jenni Barber, American actress and singer
 Jenni Calder (21st century), Scottish literary historian
 Jenni Dahlman (born 1981), Finnish model
 Jenni Dant (21st century), American basketball player
 Jenni Falconer (born 1976), Scottish television presenter
 Jenni Farley (born 1986), American television personality
 Jenni Haukio (born 1977), Finnish poet, and the wife of the current (since 2012) President of Finland
 Jenni Hucul (born 1988), Canadian bobsledder
 Jenni Irani (1923–1982), Indian cricketer
 Jenni Keenan Green (born 1970), Scottish actress
 Jenni Meno (21st century), American pair skater
 Jenni Murray (born 1950), British journalist and broadcaster
 Jenni Olson (born 1962), American film director
 Jenni Rivera (born 1969), Mexican American musician
 Jenni Trent Hughes (21st century), British television presenter
 Jenni Vartiainen (born 1983), Finnish pop singer
 Jenni Vähämaa (born 1992), Finnish figure skater

Fictional characters with the given name Jenni
 Jenni Vainio, a fictional character in the Finnish drama series Salatut elämät

People with the surname Jenni
 Clarence Marvin Jenni (1896–1973), discoverer of Jennite, a calcium silicate hydrate mineral, and director of the Geological Museum at the University of Missouri
 Florian Jenni (born 1980), Swiss chess player
 Marcel Jenni (born 1974), Swiss ice hockey player
 Alexis Jenni (born 1963), French literary writer

See also 
 Jenny (given name), includes variant spelling Jennie
 Jennifer (disambiguation)

References

Feminine given names
Finnish feminine given names